Thomas Edward Savill (born 16 May 1983) is a former English cricketer.  Savill is a right-handed batsman who bowls right-arm medium-fast.  He was born in Sheffield, Yorkshire.

Savill made his debut in List-A cricket for the Nottinghamshire Cricket Board against Bedfordshire in the 2001 Cheltenham & Gloucester Trophy at Wardown Park, Luton, with the Board losing by 3 wickets.  His second and final List-A appearance for the Board came in 1st round of the 2002 Cheltenham & Gloucester Trophy against Oxfordshire at the Christ Church Ground, Oxford.  This round of the competition was played in 2001, with the Board losing by 5 wickets.  In his 2 List-A matches for the Board he scored 50 runs, with a high score of 35*.  With the ball he took a single wicket at a bowling average of 90.00, with best figures of 1/45.

Savill made his only first-class appearance for Nottinghamshire against West Indies A in 2002. During 2002 he also made his first-class debut for Cambridge University against Middlesex.  From 2002 to 2006, he represented the University in 16 first-class matches, the last of which came against Oxford University in the 2006 season.  In his combined first-class career, he scored 363 runs at a batting average of 18.15, with 3 half centuries and a high score 59.  With the ball he took 36 wickets at a batting average of 50.88, with best figures of 4/62.  In the field he also took 12 catches. In local domestic cricket, he plays for Teddington Cricket Club in the Middlesex County Cricket League.

References

External links
Tom Savill at Cricinfo

1983 births
Living people
Cricketers from Sheffield
English cricketers
Nottinghamshire Cricket Board cricketers
Cambridge University cricketers
Nottinghamshire cricketers
Alumni of the University of Cambridge
Cambridge MCCU cricketers
English cricketers of the 21st century